Allegory of the Earth is a series of paintings by Jan Brueghel the Elder produced c. 1610. One painting from the series is in the Musée des Beaux-Arts de Nice and another is in the Musée des Beaux-Arts de Lyon.

Story
One of these paintings was stolen with 4 other paintings in 2007, before being found in Marseilles in 2008.

It is highlighted during the illuminations of the Place des Terreaux during the Festival of Lights in 2014.

References

Paintings in the collection of the Museum of Fine Arts of Lyon
1610 paintings
Paintings by Jan Brueghel the Elder
17th-century allegorical paintings
Allegorical paintings by Flemish artists
Stolen works of art